The Pikeville Bears are the athletic teams that represent the University of Pikeville, located in Pikeville, Kentucky, in intercollegiate sports as a member of the National Association of Intercollegiate Athletics (NAIA), primarily competing in the Mid-South Conference (MSC) since the 2000–01 academic year. The Bears previously competed in the Kentucky Intercollegiate Athletic Conference (KIAC; now currently known as the River States Conference (RSC) since the 2016–17 school year) from 1958–59 to 1999–2000.

Varsity teams
UPike competes in 25 intercollegiate varsity sports: men's sports include baseball, basketball, bowling, cross country, football, golf, soccer, swimming, tennis, track & field and wrestling; while women's sports include basketball, bowling, cross country, golf, soccer, softball, swimming, tennis, track & field and volleyball; and co-ed sports include archery, cheerleading, dance and eSports.

Accomplishments
Pikeville athletics have won numerous conference championships and three national championships: two in women's bowling in 2004 and 2008 and a NAIA Division I men's basketball championship in 2011.

References

External links
 

 
Bears